A fajita, in Tex-Mex cuisine, is any stripped grilled meat with stripped peppers and onions usually served on a flour or corn tortilla. The term originally referred to skirt steak, the cut of beef first used in the dish. Popular alternatives to skirt steak include chicken and other cuts of beef, as well as vegetables instead of meat. In restaurants, the meat is usually cooked with onions and bell peppers. Popular condiments include shredded lettuce, sour cream, guacamole, salsa, pico de gallo, shredded cheese, refried beans, and diced tomatoes. "Arrachera", another term for skirt steak, is also applied to a northern Mexican variant of the dish.

History

Fajita is a Tex-Mex, Texan-Mexican American or Tejano, diminutive term for little strips of meat cut from the beef skirt, the most common cut used to make fajitas. The word fajita is not known to have appeared in print until 1971, according to the Oxford English Dictionary. (The word faja is Spanish for "strip", or "belt", from the Latin fascia, "band") Although fajita originally referred to these strips of beef skirt, fajitas now are made with a variety of fillings, including vegetarian options such as green/red/yellow peppers, onions, chilies, and jalapeño peppers.

Popularity
The first culinary evidence of the fajitas with the cut of meat, the cooking style (directly on a campfire or on a grill), and the Spanish nickname goes back as far as the 1930s in the ranch lands of South and West Texas. During cattle roundups, cows were butchered regularly to feed the hands. Items such as the hide, the head, the entrails, and meat trimmings such as the skirt were given to the Mexican cowboys called vaqueros as part of their pay. Hearty border dishes like barbacoa de cabeza (head barbecue), menudo (tripe stew), and fajitas or arracheras (grilled skirt steak) have their roots in this practice. Considering the limited number of skirts per carcass and the fact the meat was not available commercially, the fajita tradition remained regional and relatively obscure for many years, probably familiar only to vaqueros, butchers, and their families.

In September 1969, Sonny Falcón, an Austin meat market manager, operated the first commercial fajita taco concession stand at a rural Diez y Seis celebration in Kyle, Texas. During that same year, Otilia Garza introduced fajitas at the Round-Up Restaurant in Pharr, Texas. Garza is credited with adding the signature sizzling plate presentation of fajitas after being served queso flameado (melted Mexican cheese) on a cast-iron plate in Acapulco.

The food was popularized by various businesses, such as Ninfa's in Houston, the Hyatt Regency in Austin, and numerous restaurants in San Antonio. In southern Arizona, the term was unknown except as a cut of meat until the 1990s, when Mexican fast food restaurants started using the word in their marketing. In recent years, fajitas have become popular at American casual dining restaurants as well as in home cooking.

In many restaurants, the fajita meat and vegetables are brought to the table sizzling loudly on a metal platter or skillet, along with warmed tortillas and condiments such as guacamole, pico de gallo, queso, salsa, shredded cheese or sour cream.

The Kyle, Texas, city council voted in August 2020 to change the name of a controversially named road, Rebel Drive, to Fajita Drive in honor of local history of the fajita, but the change was rescinded within days in response to public distaste for the new name. The council later renamed the street Veterans Drive.

See also
 Antojitos
 Burrito
 Taco

References

External links

 Encyclopedia of American Food and Drink version of fajita origins
 Cookeryonline - Fajita Page

Tex-Mex cuisine
Mexican cuisine
Tortilla-based dishes